Elias Gutiérrez (born 15 February 1911, date of death unknown) was a Colombian sprinter. He competed in the men's 100 metres and javelin at the 1936 Summer Olympics. His son, Jackie Gutiérrez, played Major League Baseball for the Boston Red Sox, Baltimore Orioles and Philadelphia Phillies between 1983 and 1988.

References

External links

1911 births
Year of death missing
Athletes (track and field) at the 1936 Summer Olympics
Colombian male sprinters
Colombian male javelin throwers
Olympic athletes of Colombia
Place of birth missing
20th-century Colombian people